In probability theory, the rectified Gaussian distribution is a modification of the Gaussian distribution when its negative elements are reset to 0 (analogous to an electronic rectifier). It is essentially a mixture of a discrete distribution (constant 0) and a continuous distribution (a truncated Gaussian distribution with interval ) as a result of censoring.

Density function 

Here,  is the cumulative distribution function (cdf) of the standard normal distribution:

 is the Dirac delta function

and,  is the unit step function:

Mean and variance 

Since the unrectified normal distribution has mean  and since in transforming it to the rectified distribution some probability mass has been shifted to a higher value (from negative values to 0), the mean of the rectified distribution is greater than 

Since the rectified distribution is formed by moving some of the probability mass toward the rest of the probability mass, the rectification is a mean-preserving contraction combined with a mean-changing rigid shift of the distribution, and thus the variance is decreased; therefore the variance of the rectified distribution is less than

Generating values 
To generate values computationally, one can use

and then

Application 
A rectified Gaussian distribution is semi-conjugate to the Gaussian likelihood, and it has been recently applied to factor analysis, or particularly, (non-negative) rectified factor analysis.
Harva proposed a variational learning algorithm for the rectified factor model, where the factors follow a mixture of rectified Gaussian; and later Meng proposed an infinite rectified factor model coupled with its Gibbs sampling solution, where the factors follow a Dirichlet process mixture of rectified Gaussian distribution, and applied it in computational biology for reconstruction of gene regulatory networks.

Extension to general bounds 
An extension to the rectified Gaussian distribution was proposed by Palmer et al., allowing rectification between arbitrary lower and upper bounds. For lower and upper bounds  and  respectively, the cdf,  is given by:

where  is the cdf of a normal distribution with mean  and variance . The mean and variance of the rectified distribution is calculated by first transforming the constraints to be acting on a standard normal distribution:

Using the transformed constraints, the mean and variance,  and  respectively, are then given by:

 

where  is the error function. This distribution was used by Palmer et al. for modelling physical resource levels, such as the quantity of liquid in a vessel, which is bounded by both 0 and the capacity of the vessel.

See also 
 Folded normal distribution
 Half-normal distribution
 Half-t distribution
 Modified half-normal distribution
 Truncated normal distribution

References 

Probability distributions
Normal distribution